Lid was a Palestinian  village in the Haifa Subdistrict. It was depopulated during the 1948 Arab–Israeli War on April 9, 1948. It was 32 km southeast of Haifa.

History
The Khirbat al-Manatir contained artifacts from the Byzantine period.

Ottoman era
In 1881, the PEF's Survey of Western Palestine (SWP) found at Ludd "traces of ruins, with a pillar-shaft near a spring."

While surveying for the construction of the Jezreel Valley railway, Gottlieb Schumacher noted in 1900 that Ludd was a "flourishing village" of 46 huts and 200 inhabitants, built up by the Bedouin of the Merj.

British Mandate era
In the 1922 census of Palestine conducted by the British Mandate authorities, the tribal area of Al Awadein had a population of 402 Muslims, increasing in the 1931 census to 451, in 87 houses. In the 1945 statistics it had a population of 640 Muslims, and the total area was 13,572 dunams. Of the land, 103 dunams were used for plantations and irrigable land, 13,063 for cereals, and 52 were built-up (urban) areas.

1948 and aftermath
After the war the area was incorporated into the State of Israel. The moshav of HaYogev was established in 1949, west of the village site and partly on village land.

In 1992 the village site was described as "Piles of stones, scattered across the ground near several large eucalyptus and olive trees, are all that remain of the village. There is a newly-built structure over the village well."

References

Bibliography

External links
Welcome To Lid, Khirbat
Khirbet Lid (al-'Awwadin), Zochrot
Survey of Western Palestine, Map 8: IAA,  Wikimedia commons
Lid, khirbat, from the Khalil Sakakini Cultural Center

Arab villages depopulated during the 1948 Arab–Israeli War
District of Haifa